Maromiandra is a town and commune in Madagascar. It belongs to the district of Toliara II, which is a part of Atsimo-Andrefana Region. The population of the commune was estimated to be approximately 8,000 in 2001 commune census.

Primary and junior level secondary education are available in town. The majority 98% of the population of the commune are farmers.  The most important crop is maize, while other important products are sugarcane, cassava and sweet potatoes.  Industry and services provide employment for 0.85% and 1.15% of the population, respectively.

References and notes 

Populated places in Atsimo-Andrefana